The flat worm lizard (Agamodon compressus) is a species of reptile in the family Trogonophidae. It is found in Somalia.

References

Agamodon
Endemic fauna of Somalia
Reptiles of Somalia
Reptiles described in 1888
Taxa named by François Mocquard